Air Vice-Marshal George Henry Morley CB CBE FRCS (22 February 1907- 26 May 1971) was a British military doctor, an expert on plastic surgery, particularly the treatment of burns, and senior RAF officer.

References 

1907 births
1971 deaths
Commanders of the Order of the British Empire
Companions of the Order of the Bath